Salles-sur-Garonne (literally Salles on Garonne) is a commune in the Haute-Garonne department in southwestern France.

Population

Geography
The commune is bordered by five other communes: Lafitte-Vigordane to the north, Carbonne to the northeast, Rieux-Volvestre across the river Garonne to the east, Saint-Julien-sur-Garonne to the south, and Saint-Élix-le-Château to the east.

The river Garonne flows through the commune, making the suffix -sur-Garonne, forming a border with Saint-Julien-sur-Garonne.

International relations
In 2010, Salles-sur-Garonne became a sister city of Lhatse, Tibet.

See also
Communes of the Haute-Garonne department

References

Communes of Haute-Garonne